Darren M. Haynes is an eleven-time Emmy Award-winning Sports Anchor who joined CBS affiliate WUSA in Washington, D.C., in August 2017 as a Sports Director for that station.  He was previously a Sports Anchor for ESPN's SportsCenter.

Broadcasting career
Darren is currently the Sports Director and Main Sports Anchor at WUSA in Washington D.C.  He also anchored at ESPN. During his time at the World-Wide Leader, he anchored SportsCenter, ESPN’s flagship program. His career includes the Super Bowl, NBA Finals, Stanley Cup Finals, NASCAR Cup Series Championship, World Series and more.

Haynes' first television sports reporting job was with Rob Parker's SportsRap in Detroit in 2005.

Haynes then worked at ABC affiliate WLAJ in Lansing, Michigan, in 2006 as a reporter and sports anchor. His reporting duties included the Detroit Lions, Detroit Pistons, Detroit Tigers, Michigan State athletics, and high school sports.

Haynes also worked at CBS affiliate WBKB-TV in Alpena, Michigan in 2007.

He then worked at KGBT-TV in Harlingen, Texas, from 2007–2010, where he was a sports anchor and reporter. During his three years at KGBT, he was Texas AP Sportscaster of the year in 2008 and Rio Grande Valley Sports Broadcaster of year in 2008 and 2009.

He then joined KABB in San Antonio, Texas from 2010–2012, as a sports anchor and reporter on Maximum Sports. At KABB, Haynes was nominated for two broadcaster Emmy Awards. He also worked a KMYS as a sideline reporter for Thursday Night Lights high school football show.

He then joined now-former NBC affiliate WHDH in Boston, Massachusetts from 2012–2013, as a sports anchor and reporter. He also was a sports anchor at Al Jazeera America in New York, New York in 2013.

Haynes then joined ESPN and debuted on March 13, 2014, on the 3:00 p.m. ET edition of SportsCenter. He created segments such as "Suit-it or Boot-it", "SC Vocal Point" and "Sunday's Best". Haynes also appeared on SportsCenter Top Plays of the Month and NBA Tonight.  He was laid off from ESPN on April 26, 2017.

In August 2017, Haynes joined WUSA, the Tegna-owned CBS station in Washington, D.C., as its sports director, a position that had been vacant since the resignation of Brett Haber (also an ESPN alum) in July 2011.

Public image
Haynes has been recognized as one of the "Most Influential Blacks" by the NAACP. He received the "Community Service Award"  for his work in the city of New Haven Connecticut, "Outstanding Leadership Award" for his work with the Pregnant and Parenting Teens Program as well as the "Media Recognition Award" for his fight against domestic violence with the Love Life Now Foundation. In 2007, he launched the Junior Broadcast Program that has helped hundreds of aspiring journalists achieve their dreams in the media industry.  His motivational speeches help individuals increase confidence and use personal power to activate their ideal life. His mantra is "I would be a fool not to give back to the community that raised me." Darren continues to host seminars across the country, teaching and motivating high school and college students to never give up on their dreams.

Personal life
Haynes is a Connecticut native, a graduate of Amity Regional High School in Woodbridge, Connecticut. Haynes was inducted into the Amity Hall of Honor Class of 2016. Haynes received his undergraduate degree from Wayne State University in Detroit, Michigan. In 2021, Darren received the Lifetime Achievement Award from Wayne State University. He is also a member of Omega Psi Phi Family: William Haynes Jr., Kelli Gorman, A'lan Murray, Andre DeVan, Keith Murray, Edna Fennell, (Deceased) Roderick Gorman. He married Teddi Adderly on April 15, 2018 in Houston, Texas.

Player career
Haynes was a highly recruited running back at Amity Regional High School in Woodbridge, Connecticut,. He attended University of Rhode Island on a full athletic football scholarship before transferring to play college football at the University of New Haven. There he broke the single game rushing record and received numerous NCAA accolades from both UNH and Wayne State University. Haynes was inducted into the New Haven Gridiron Hall of Fame Class of 2016.

References

1981 births
American sports journalists
Living people
Place of birth missing (living people)
Wayne State University alumni
Journalists from Connecticut